Horton-cum-Peel is a former civil parish, now in the parish of Ashton Hayes and Horton-cum-Peel, in Cheshire West and Chester, England. It contains five buildings that are recorded in the National Heritage List for England as designated listed buildings.  One of these is listed at Grade II*, the middle grade, and the rest are at the lowest grade, Grade II. The parish is entirely rural. The list consists of two farmhouses with associated structures.

Key

Buildings

See also
 Listed buildings in Barrow
 Listed buildings in Delamere
 Listed buildings in Kelsall
 Listed buildings in Manley
 Listed buildings in Mouldsworth
 Listed buildings in Oakmere
 Listed buildings in Tarvin

References
Citations

Sources

Listed buildings in Cheshire West and Chester
Lists of listed buildings in Cheshire